Ooni Ayetise was the 7th Ooni of Ife, a paramount traditional ruler of Ile Ife, the ancestral home of the Yorubas. He succeeded Obalufon Alayemore and was succeeded by  
Ooni Lajamisan.

References

Oonis of Ife
Yoruba history